Escape from Alcatraz is a 1979 American prison thriller film directed by Don Siegel. It is an adaptation of the 1963 non-fiction book of the same name by J. Campbell Bruce and dramatizes the 1962 prisoner escape from the maximum security prison on Alcatraz Island. The film stars Clint Eastwood, and features Patrick McGoohan, Fred Ward, Jack Thibeau, and Larry Hankin. Danny Glover appears in his film debut. Escape from Alcatraz marks the fifth and final collaboration between Siegel and Eastwood, following Coogan's Bluff (1968), Two Mules for Sister Sara (1970), The Beguiled (1971), and Dirty Harry (1971).

Plot
In early 1960 Frank Morris, an exceptionally intelligent criminal who has absconded from other facilities, arrives at the maximum security prison on Alcatraz Island. The Warden curtly informs him that Alcatraz is unique within the US prison system for its exceedingly high level of security and that no inmate has ever successfully escaped. During the conversation Morris steals one of the nail clippers on the desk.

Over the next several days Morris makes acquaintances with a few inmates: the eccentric Litmus, who is fond of desserts; English, a black inmate serving two life sentences for killing two white men in self-defence; and the elderly Doc, who paints portraits and once grew chrysanthemums at Alcatraz. Morris also makes an enemy of a rapist nicknamed Wolf, who tries to harass him in the showers and later attacks him in the prison yard with a knife. Both men are imprisoned in isolation in the hole.

Morris is released while Wolf stays. The Warden discovers that Doc has painted a portrait of him, as well as other guards on the island itself.  Despite the paintings being respectful and flattering likenesses, he permanently removes Doc's painting privileges just to be cruel. Doc is depressed and hacks off several fingers of his left hand with a hatchet from the prison workshop before being led away.

Later, Morris encounters two bank robbers and brothers John and Clarence Anglin, who are his old friends from another prison sentence, and he links up with prisoner Charley Butts. Morris notices that the concrete around the grille in his cell is weak and can be chipped away, which evolves into an escape plan. Over the next few months Morris, the Anglins, and Butts dig through the walls of their cells with spoons (which have been soldered into makeshift shovels), make papier-mâché dummies to act as decoys, and construct a raft out of raincoats.

During mealtime Morris places a chrysanthemum at the table in honour of Doc, but the Warden stops by and crushes it, causing a provoked and angry Litmus to suffer a heart attack. The Warden orders an inspection of Morris' cell but finds nothing unusual. Nonetheless, he issues orders for Morris to be relocated to a different cell as soon as possible. Wolf has been released from solitary confinement and prepares to attack Morris again, but English is able to intercept him, with English implying that his gang will beat up Wolf.

That night, the inmates decide they are now ready to leave. Morris, the Anglins and Butts plan to meet in the passageway and escape. Butts loses his nerve and fails to rendezvous with them. He later changes his mind but is too late and returns to his cell where he sulks over his missed opportunity.

Carrying the flotation gear, Morris and the Anglins access the roof and avoid the searchlights. They scramble down the side of the building into the prison yard, climb over a barbed-wire fence, and make their way to the shoreline of the island, where they inflate the raft. The three men depart from Alcatraz, partially submerged in the water, clinging to the raft and using their legs as the primary propelling force.

The following morning the escape is discovered and a massive manhunt ensues. Shreds of raincoat material, including personal effects of the men, are found floating in the bay. While searching on Angel Island, the Warden stubbornly insists that the men's personal effects were important, and the men would have drowned before leaving them behind. A guard believes the convicts got rid of them on the pretence that they drowned. The  Warden is informed by his aide that he has been summoned to go to Washington to face his superiors, with the prospect of being forced to accept an early retirement/termination of his duties for having failed to prevent the breakout from happening. On a rock he finds a chrysanthemum and is told by the aide that none grow on Angel Island. An epilogue text notes that the fugitives were never found, and that Alcatraz was closed less than a year later.

Cast

 Clint Eastwood as Frank Morris
 Patrick McGoohan as the Warden
 Fred Ward as John Anglin
 Jack Thibeau as Clarence Anglin
 Larry Hankin as Charley Butts
 Frank Ronzio as Litmus
 Roberts Blossom as Chester "Doc" Dalton
 Paul Benjamin as English
 Bruce M. Fischer as Wolf Grace
 Danny Glover as Inmate

Production

Screenplay and filming
Alcatraz was closed shortly after the true events on which the film was based. Screenwriter Richard Tuggle spent six months researching and writing a screenplay based on the 1963 non-fiction account by J. Campbell Bruce. He went to the Writers Guild and received a list of literary agents who would accept unsolicited manuscripts. He submitted a copy to each, and also to anybody else in the business that he could cajole into reading it.

Everyone rejected it, saying it had poor dialogue and characters, lacked a love interest, and that the public was not interested in prison stories. Tuggle decided to bypass producers and executives and deal directly with filmmakers. He called the agent for director Don Siegel and lied, saying he had met Siegel at a party and the director had expressed interest in reading his script. The agent forwarded the script to Siegel, who read it, liked it, and passed it on to Clint Eastwood.

Eastwood was drawn to the role as ringleader Frank Morris and agreed to star, provided Siegel would direct under the Malpaso banner. Siegel insisted that it be a Don Siegel film and outmanoeuvred Eastwood by purchasing the rights to the film for $100,000. This created a rift between the two friends. Although Siegel eventually agreed for it to be a Malpaso-Siegel production, Siegel went to Paramount Pictures, a rival studio, and never directed an Eastwood picture again.

Although Alcatraz had its own power plant, it was no longer functional, and 15 miles of cable were required to connect the island to San Francisco's electricity. As Siegel and Tuggle worked on the script, the producers paid $500,000 to restore the decaying prison and recreate the cold atmosphere; some interiors had to be recreated in the studio. Many of the improvements were kept intact after the film was made.

Siegel's original ending closed with the guards’ discovery of the dummy head in Morris's bed, leaving it uncertain whether the escape attempt had succeeded or failed. Eastwood disliked this and extended the ending by having the Warden searching Angel Island and discovering a chrysanthemum on the rocks, a genus not native to the island but grown on Alcatraz by Doc, and later used by Morris, though it is left unclear if the chrysanthemum was placed there by Morris having survived, or simply washed up when Morris drowned. The Warden is then informed by his aide that he has been summoned to catch the next plane to Washington to face his superiors: it is left up to the viewers to conclude whether or not the escapees succeeded in making their escape.

Historical accuracy

The film's final scene implies that the escape was successful, but in fact it remains a mystery whether this is so. Circumstantial evidence uncovered in the early 2010s seemed to suggest that the men had survived, and that, contrary to the official FBI report of the escapees' raft never being recovered and no car thefts being reported, a raft was discovered on nearby Angel Island with footprints leading away (similar to the fictional scene in the movie where the Warden finds a chrysanthemum possibly left by the escapees)

The character Charley Butts was based on a fourth inmate, Allen West, who did participate in the real escape but was left behind when he couldn’t remove his ventilator grille on the night of the escape. He aided the FBI's official investigation of the escape.

The Warden as portrayed in the film is a fictional character. The film is set between the arrival of Morris at Alcatraz in January 1960 and his escape in June 1962. Shortly after he arrives, Morris meets the Warden, who remains in office over the course of the entire movie. In reality, Warden Madigan had been replaced by Blackwell in 1961. The Warden character mentions his predecessors Johnston (1934–48) and (incorrectly) Blackwell (1961–63). Blackwell served as Warden of Alcatraz at its most difficult time from 1961 to 1963, when it was facing closure as a decaying prison and financing problems and at the time of the June 1962 escape. He was at that time on vacation at Lake Berryessa in Napa County, California.

The incident in which Doc chops off several fingers with a hatchet was based on an actual incident in 1937. Inmate Rufe Persful, maddened by what was then a policy of strict silence at all times, cut off four fingers with a hatchet to try to get transferred off Alcatraz.

Reception

Critical response
Escape from Alcatraz was well received by critics and is considered by many as one of the best films of 1979. Frank Rich of Time described the film as "cool, cinematic grace", while Stanley Kauffmann of The New Republic called it "crystalline cinema". Vincent Canby of The New York Times called it "a first-rate action movie," noting that "Mr. Eastwood fulfills the demands of the role and of the film as probably no other actor could. Is it acting? I don't know, but he's the towering figure in its landscape." Variety called it "one of the finest prison films ever made."

Roger Ebert gave the film 3.5 stars out of 4, writing, "For almost all of its length, 'Escape from Alcatraz' is a taut and toughly wrought portrait of life in a prison. It is also a masterful piece of storytelling, in which the characters say little and the camera explains the action." Gene Siskel of the Chicago Tribune awarded 3 stars out of 4, calling it "very entertaining and well made. The principal problem is a too-quick ending that catches us by surprise." Kevin Thomas of the Los Angeles Times wrote, "A delight for cineastes, 'Escape From Alcatraz' could serve as a textbook example in breathtakingly economical, swift and stylish screen storytelling."

Review aggregation website Rotten Tomatoes retrospectively reported that 97% of 29 critics gave the film a positive review, with an average rating of 7/10. The site's critics consensus reads, "Escape from Alcatraz makes brilliant use of the tense claustrophobia of its infamous setting -- as well as its leading man's legendarily flinty resolve." On Metacritic, the film has a weighted average score of 76 out of 100 based on nine critics, indicating "generally favorable reviews."

Box office
The film grossed $5.3 million in the U.S. during its opening weekend from June 24, 1979, shown on 815 screens. In total, the film grossed an estimated $43 million in the U.S. and Canada based on theatrical rentals of $21.5 million, making it the 15th highest-grossing picture of 1979.

Legacy
In 2001, the American Film Institute nominated this film for AFI's 100 Years...100 Thrills.

Quentin Tarantino called it "both fascinating and exhilarating... cinematically speaking, it's Siegel’s most expressive film. "

See also
 Alcatraz: The Whole Shocking Story
 Alcatraz Island in popular culture
 Alcatraz Dining Hall
 Survival film, about the film genre, with a list of related films
 The Shawshank Redemption

References

Notes

Bibliography

External links
 
 
 

1979 films
1979 action films
Action films based on actual events
Alcatraz Island in fiction
American action thriller films
American prison films
American docudrama films
Escapes and escape attempts from Alcatraz
Films about prison escapes
Films based on non-fiction books
Films directed by Don Siegel
Films scored by Jerry Fielding
Films set in 1962
Films set on islands
Films set in San Francisco
Films set in the San Francisco Bay Area
Films shot in San Francisco
Malpaso Productions films
Paramount Pictures films
1970s English-language films
1970s American films